Hedwig of Holstein or Helvig() (1260–1324) was Queen of Sweden as the consort of King Magnus III Barnlock. Her parents were Gerhard I, Count of Holstein-Itzehoe (died 1290) and Elisabeth of Mecklenburg (died 1280).

Biography
Hedwig was married to Magnus Ladulås in 1276, and was granted the fief of Dåvö in Munktorp in Västmanland. Magnus succeeded in preventing a Danish-Holstein alliance by marrying her. However, he had obtained a dispensation for their marriage only after the wedding.

Her father was captured during the Folkunge party revolt (Folkungaupproret) by rebellious noblemen in Skara in 1278 and the queen was also targeted. The actions of the rebels were well timed; they coincided with her journey through Sweden. She sought refuge in the convent in the city.

Hedwig was crowned Queen of Sweden in the city of Söderköping on 29 June 1281; this is the first confirmed coronation of a queen consort in Sweden. It included the prayers for her fertility, which was the matter of great importance. She founded the Greyfriars convent (Gråmunkekloster) in Stockholm and several other churches and convents. As a queen, however, she is not very much heard of, despite the fact that she held the position for fourteen years, she lived a discreet life, both as a queen and as a dowager queen. She took a prominent part in processions which accompanied the inauguration of bishops, celebrations of a feast day and the installation of relics, such as the Mass for Saint Erik in 1277.

After the death of her spouse in 1290, Hedwig acted as one of the executors of the will of the King. In 1291, she withdrew to her estate Dåvö in Västmanland. She is not known to have taken any political role, formal or informal, during or after the reign of her spouse. She was described as a noble, loyal and peace-loving mother figure, tormented by the conflicts between her sons. She acted as a foster mother for her son's future bride, Martha of Denmark, who spent a lot of her childhood in Sweden as the future Queen of Sweden after 1290. In 1302, she was present at the coronation of her son.

As dowager queen, she governed Fjärdhundraland, which was given to her as dower.

Queen Hedwig is buried in Riddarholm Church in Stockholm, with her husband and her daughter Richeza.

Children
Hedwig's wedding took place at Kalmar castle on 11 November 1276 with king Magnus III Ladulås of Sweden. They had the following children:

 Ingeborg Magnusdotter of Sweden, born abt. 1279.  Married King Eric VI of Denmark, Erik Menved.
 Birger Magnusson, born abt. 1280, king of Sweden.
 Eric Magnusson, Duke of Södermanland in 1302 and Halland etc. c 1305, born abt. 1282. Died of starvation 1318 at Nyköpingshus Castle while imprisoned by his brother, King Birger.
 Valdemar Magnusson, Duke of Finland in 1302 and Öland 1310. Died of starvation 1318 at Nyköpingshus castle while imprisoned by his brother King Birger.
 Richeza Magnusdotter of Sweden, abbess of the convent of St. Clara at Stockholm. Died after 1347.

Notes

References
 Dick Harrison: Jarlens Sekel, Ordfront Förlag, 2002
 Nordisk Familjebok, Uggleupplagan, band 11, sida 373, Stockholm 1909
 Åke Ohlmarks: Alla Sveriges drottningar (All the queens of Sweden) (Swedish)
 Svenska Familje-Journalen, band XI, årgång 1872, s. 194

|-

Queen mothers
Helvig
1260 births
1324 deaths
House of Schauenburg
Burials at Riddarholmen Church
House of Bjelbo
13th-century German people
13th-century Swedish people
14th-century Swedish people
14th-century Swedish women
13th-century Swedish women
13th-century German women
Daughters of monarchs